Persistent tunica vasculosa lentis is a congenital ocular anomaly. It is a form of persistent hyperplastic primary vitreous (PHPV).

It is a developmental disorder of the vitreous. It is usually unilateral and first noticed in the neonatal period. It may be associated with microphthalmos, cataracts, and increased intraocular pressure.  Elongated ciliary processes are visible through the dilated pupil. A USG B-scan confirms diagnosis in the presence of a cataract.

See also
 Persistent fetal vasculature
Tunica vasculosa lentis

References

 http://www.djo.harvard.edu/files/1568.pdf 
 Wright KW, Spiegel PH, Buckley EG. Pediatric Ophthalmology and Strabismus. Springer; US, New York: 2003. p. 17.

Eye diseases